College Station Independent School District is a public school district based in College Station, Texas (USA).

Its boundary includes almost all of College Station.

In 2009, the school district was rated "academically acceptable" by the Texas Education Agency.

Schools

High schools (Grades 9–12)
A&M Consolidated High School
College Station High School
College  View  High School

Middle schools (Grades 7–8)
A&M Consolidated Middle School
College Station Middle School
Wellborn Middle School

Intermediate schools (Grades 5–6)
Cypress Grove Intermediate School
Oakwood Intermediate School
Pecan Trail Intermediate School

Elementary schools (Grades PK–4)
College Hills Elementary School
Creek View Elementary School
Forest Ridge Elementary School
Greens Prairie Elementary School
Pebble Creek Elementary School
River Bend Elementary School
Rock Prairie Elementary School
South Knoll Elementary School
Southwood Valley Elementary School
Spring Creek Elementary School

See also

 Bryan Independent School District
 Dick Hervey, former trustee and former mayor of College Station

References

External links

TEA report for College Station ISD

School districts in Brazos County, Texas
College Station, Texas